Arthur Lacon Watson (27 August 1866 — 28 June 1955) was an English first-class cricketer.

The son of The Reverend Arthur Watson, he was born on the Isle of Wight at Northwood in August 1866. He was educated at Winchester College, after which he matriculated to Trinity College, Cambridge. In the same year that he matriculated, Watson made a single appearance in first-class cricket for Hampshire against Sussex at Southampton. While studying at Cambridge, he also made one first-class appearance for Cambridge University Cricket Club against Surrey at The Oval in 1888. In his two first-class matches, he scored 26 runs with a high score of 22. After graduating from Cambridge, Watson became an assistant master at Narborough in Leicestershire, before becoming a private tutor. Watson died on the Isle of Wight at Wootton Bridge in June 1955.

References

External links

1866 births
1955 deaths
People from Cowes
Sportspeople from the Isle of Wight
People educated at Winchester College
Alumni of Trinity College, Cambridge
English cricketers
Hampshire cricketers
Cambridge University cricketers
Schoolteachers from the Isle of Wight